Atashan or Ateshan may refer to:

Ateshan, Kerman
Atashan, Anbarabad, Kerman Province
Atashan, Tehran

See also
Ateshun (disambiguation)